Sta.Elena School of Novaliches is a Catholic school in North Novaliches, Caloocan, Philippines.

References

Schools in Caloocan